Leslie MacDonald Piggot (12 May 1942 – 30 October 2022) was a British sprinter who competed in the 1972 Summer Olympics. Piggot was born in Rutherglen on 12 May 1942, and died in East Kilbride on 30 October 2022, at the age of 80.

References

1942 births
2022 deaths
Sportspeople from Glasgow
British male sprinters
Scottish male sprinters
Olympic athletes of Great Britain
Athletes (track and field) at the 1972 Summer Olympics
Commonwealth Games competitors for Scotland
Athletes (track and field) at the 1970 British Commonwealth Games
Athletes (track and field) at the 1974 British Commonwealth Games